François Hamon (born 20 January 1939) is a French former cyclist. He competed in the individual road race and team time trial events at the 1960 Summer Olympics.

References

External links
 

1939 births
Living people
French male cyclists
Olympic cyclists of France
Cyclists at the 1960 Summer Olympics
Sportspeople from Finistère
Cyclists from Brittany